Narendra Modi, the leader of Bharatiya Janata Party, was sworn in as Chief Minister of Gujarat for the fourth time in 2012 following victory in 2012 Gujarat Legislative Assembly election.

Cabinet ministers
Babubhai Bokhiria
Bhupendrasinh Chudasma
Anandiben Patel 
Nitin Patel
Saurabh Patel
Ramanlal Vora

Ministers of State
Pradipsinh Jadeja
Jayanti Kavadia
Govind Patel
Parbat Patel 
Rajni Patel
Purshottam Solanki 
Vasuben Trivedi 
Liladhar Vaghela 
Nanu Vanani
Ganpat Vasava

References

Modi 04
Modi IV
Chief Ministership of Narendra Modi
2012 establishments in Gujarat
Cabinets established in 2012
2014 disestablishments in India
Cabinets disestablished in 2014